Manuel de Conejos y Egüés (3 June 1657 in San Martin del Rio –  11 April 1729 in Burgos) was a Spanish composer.

References

Spanish Baroque composers
1657 births
1729 deaths
18th-century classical composers
18th-century male musicians
18th-century musicians
Spanish male classical composers